Josep Maria Farré Naudi  (born 8 May 1960) is an Andorran politician. He is a member of the Liberals of Andorra.

External links

Page at the General Council of the Principality of Andorra

Members of the General Council (Andorra)
1960 births
Living people
Liberal Party of Andorra politicians
Place of birth missing (living people)